Live at Hollywood High (officially released as Live at Hollywood High/The Costello Show Vol. 2) is a recording by Elvis Costello and the Attractions from a 1978 concert at Hollywood High School in Los Angeles, California.  Three songs from the concert were originally included as a bonus 7" vinyl EP that sold with initial pressings of the Armed Forces album in 1979. A 2002 re-issue of Armed Forces added six tracks to the three from the EP (for a total of nine tracks) and placed them in proper running order. In 2010, the Hip-O Select label released a full version of Live at Hollywood High with all 20 tracks from the concert on one CD.

This release followed three earlier concert releases from Elvis Costello, including:
Nashville Rooms (London, England), recorded on 7 August 1977, which was included as a bonus CD on the 2007 deluxe edition of My Aim Is True (1977).
Warner Theatre (Washington, DC), recorded on 28 February 1978, which was included on the deluxe edition of This Year's Model (1978).
El Mocambo (Toronto, Ontario), recorded on 6 March 1978, which was released by CBS as a promotional LP in Canada and re-released in 1993 as one of four CDs on the 2½ Years box set. It was later given a stand-alone release as The Costello Show: Live at the El Mocambo in 2009. The original vinyl LP and CD re-releases of this concert all contain the same songs.

Track listing

Notes
Tracks 1, 13, and 15 composed the original 3-track vinyl EP included in early copies of Armed Forces. Tracks 1, 2, 5, 7, 11, 13, 14, 15, and 16 were included on the bonus disc of Armed Forces from 2002.

Personnel
Elvis Costello – guitar, vocals
The Attractions
Steve Nieve – keyboards, backing vocals
Bruce Thomas – bass, backing vocals
Pete Thomas – drums

2010 live albums
Elvis Costello live albums
Albums produced by Nick Lowe